Victor Bello is a former mayor of Bell, California.

Bello had been a member of the Bell City Council for over a decade, resigning in 2009, and served as the mayor in 2002–2003.

On August 1, 2014, Bello was sentenced to 1 year in jail and 5 years of probation as part of the City of Bell scandal.

References

Living people
Mayors of places in California
People from Bell, California
Year of birth missing (living people)